Tutsingle Mountain is a mountain on the Stikine Plateau in northern British Columbia, Canada, located east of Nuthinaw Mountain and northwest of Dease Lake on the northeast side of the Tachilta Lakes. It is a product of subglacial volcanism during the Pleistocene period when this area was covered by thick glacial ice, forming a subglacial volcano that never broke through the overlying glacial ice known as a subglacial mound.

See also
 List of Northern Cordilleran volcanoes
 List of volcanoes in Canada
 Volcanism of Canada
 Volcanism of Western Canada

References
 
 Tutsingale Mountain in the Canadian Mountain Encyclopedia
 Catalogue of Canadian volcanoes: Tutsingale Mountain

One-thousanders of British Columbia
Volcanoes of British Columbia
Subglacial mounds of Canada
Cassiar Country
Stikine Plateau
Pleistocene volcanoes
Northern Cordilleran Volcanic Province